George Cassidy may refer to:
George Williams Cassidy (1836–1892), U. S. Representative from Nevada, 1881–1885
One of Butch Cassidy's many aliases
George Cassidy (Australian footballer) (1905–1985), Australian footballer for Melbourne
George Cassidy (bishop) (born 1942), Anglican Bishop of Southwell and Nottingham
George Cassidy (coach), college football coach